Totsky District is an administrative and municipal district (raion), one of the thirty-five in Orenburg Oblast, Russia. It is located in the west of the oblast. Its administrative center is the rural locality (a selo) of Totskoye. Population: 32,866 (2010 Census);  The population of Totskoye accounts for 21.0% of the district's total population.

References

Notes

Sources

Districts of Orenburg Oblast